Ghost Valley is a 1932 American pre-Code film starring Tom Keene. It made a profit of $20,000.

Plot
A jailed cowpoke is hired by the corrupt Judge Drake to impersonate one of the heirs to a gold mine.  The cowpoke is in fact, the missing heir, Jerry Long.  Jerry Long fights and outwits the Judge and his henchmen, while winning the heart of the other heir to the mine, Jane Worth.

Cast

 Tom Keene as Jerry Long
 Merna Kennedy as Jane Worth
 Kate Campbell as Miss Trumpet
 Mitchell Harris as Judge J. Drake
 Ted Adams as Gordon
 Harry Bowen as Marty
 Harry Semels as Henchman
 Billy Franey as Scrubby Watson
 Al Taylor as Henchman
 Buck Moulton as Henchman
 Slim Whitaker as Henchman
 George 'Gabby' Hayes as Dave

(cast list as per AFI database)

References

External links 
 Ghost Valley at IMDb
 
 
 

1932 Western (genre) films
1932 films
American black-and-white films
American Western (genre) films
Films directed by Fred Allen (film editor)
1930s American films